Bnei Yehuda Tel Aviv F.C. (Moadon Kaduregel Bnei Yehuda Tel Aviv), commonly referred to as Bnei Yehuda, is an Israeli football club from the Hatikva Quarter of the city of Tel Aviv. The club is currently a member of the Liga Leumit.

History
The club was formed in January 1936 by Yemenite religious Jews, With them Nathan Sulami and his friends. It was named after Judah (Hebrew: יהודה, Yehuda), because the decision on its formation occurred during the week when the Torah portion of Vayigash (beginning with the words "Then Judah approached him") is read in the Synagogue, and the Jews of Yemen are descendants of Judah ben Jacob. Sulami and his friends were first promoted to the top division in 1959. Two seasons later they narrowly avoided relegation, finishing second from bottom. In 1965 the club reached the State Cup final for the first time, but lost 2–1 to Maccabi Tel Aviv. In 1968 they reached the final again, this time beating Hapoel Petah Tikva to claim their first piece of major silverware.

After several near-misses, the club was relegated at the end of the 1971–72 season after finishing second from bottom. However, they made an immediate return as Liga Alef champions but were relegated again in 1976. In the 1977–78 season the club were promoted back to the top division as Liga Artzit champions, and also reached the State Cup final, where they lost 2–1 to Maccabi Netanya. The following season the club finished fourth in Liga Leumit.

The 1980–81 season was the club's best so far. Managed by Shlomo Sharf they finished second in the league and reached the cup final again, this time beating Hapoel Tel Aviv 4–3 after a penalty shootout. However, the success was not maintained, and they were relegated at the end of the 1983–84 season.

The club made an immediate return as Liga Artzit champions and finished second in 1986–87. The 1989–90 season saw the club win its first, and to date only, championship under the leadership of Giora Spiegel. Two seasons later they won the Toto Cup for the first time, repeating the feat in 1997.

The 2000–01 season saw Bnei Yehuda finish second from bottom of the Premier League (which had replaced Liga Leumit as the top division) and the club was relegated. However, they made an immediate return as Liga Leumit runners-up. In 2005–06 they reached the cup final, losing 1–0 to Hapoel Tel Aviv, but also qualifying for Europe for the first time. In the 2006–07 UEFA Cup they lost 6–0 on aggregate to Lokomotiv Sofia and had to play their home match in Senec in Slovakia due to security concerns.
At the beginning of the 2006–07 season Abu Siam made the eyebrow-raising decision to sign with one of Mac TA's crosstown rivals, Bnei Yehuda Tel Aviv, a club with a fanatical fanbase smaller than Maccabi's, but more violent. Which is Bnei Yehuda. Although at the beginning of the season the fans ridiculed the decision to sign the club's first Arab player, the furor soon died down, which came to a surprise following similar affairs with Beitar Jerusalem that had occurred in 2005 and 2006 in regards to efforts to sign Muslim Nigerian player Ndala Ibrahim.

In the 2009–10 season Bnei Yehuda reached the European League play-off, after starting in the first qualifying round, but lost to PSV 2–0 on aggregate. The following season they reached the second qualifying round of the Europa League, but lost to Shamrock Rovers.

From 2009–10 to the 2012–13 season, Bnei Yehuda managed to finish regularly in the top 3–4 ranks of the Israeli Premier League which won her participation in the European League qualifying. Following the success, the group became a springboard for players. Many players who were remarkable in the ranks of Bnei Yehuda have moved or were sold to bigger clubs and others were called to the national team.

In the 2013–14 season, Bnei Yehuda finished bottom and relegated to Liga Leumit. However, they made an immediate return to the Premier League as the 2014–15 Liga Leumit champions.

In the 2016–17 season, the club won the National cup, and it was their first major title in 27 years (last one was the championship in 1989-90).

In 2017, HAP Investments became the Group's main sponsor. In June 2018 a new contract was signed for the 2018/2019 season.

Fans
The Bnei Yehuda fanbase is predominantly a working class neighbourhood support from Hatikva, and has one supporter group, the ultras "Lions Army", who express far-right political views. have been involved in various racist incidents, such as that involving Arab player Salim Tyameh and have developed a reputation for this as well as violence. The fans heavily criticised Ismaila Soro when he decided to move to Celtic F.C.

Stadium
For most of its existence, Bnei Yehuda played at the Hatikva Neighborhood Stadium in the Hatikva Quarter of Tel Aviv. However, in 2004 the team moved their home matches to the Bloomfield Stadium, though the club offices, the team's practice grounds and most activities within the club are still held in the Hatikva Neighborhood Stadium.

European record

Notes
 Q1: First qualifying round
 Q2: Second qualifying round
 Q3: Third qualifying round
 PO: Play-off round

Players

Current squad
 As of 31 January 2023

Out on loan

Titles

League

Cup competitions

Managers
 Emmanuel Scheffer (1962–63)
 Israel Halivner (1964)
 Ze'ev Seltzer (1978–80)
 Shlomo Scharf (1980–83)
 Giora Spiegel (1989–92)
 Yehoshua Feigenbaum (1997–98)
 Giora Spiegel (1999–00)
 Eli Ohana (2000–01), (2001–03)
 Nitzan Shirazi (2005–08)
 Eli Cohen (born 1951) (Jan 21, 2008 – March 30, 2008)
 Hezi Shirazi (March 30, 2008 – June 30, 2008)
 Guy Luzon (July 1, 2008 – May 31, 2010)
 Dror Kashtan (July 1, 2010 – June 4, 2011)
 Yossi Abukasis (June 14, 2011 – May 13, 2012)
 Dror Kashtan (May 13, 2012 – Dec 9, 2013)
 Yossi Abukasis (Dec 9, 2013–16)
 Yossi Mizrahi (2016)
 Arik Benado (2016)
 Nissan Yehezkel (2016–2017)
 Yossi Abukasis (2017–2020)
 Elisha Levy (2020–present)

References

External links

Official website  
Fans forum 
Bnei Yehuda Museum Encyclopedia of Bnei Yehuda 
Arayot Yehuda Fan Club 
Bnei Yehuda Fansite 

 
Association football clubs established in 1936
Tel Aviv
Football clubs in Tel Aviv
1936 establishments in Mandatory Palestine